In mathematics, the uniform boundedness principle or Banach–Steinhaus theorem is one of the fundamental results in functional analysis. 
Together with the Hahn–Banach theorem and the open mapping theorem, it is considered one of the cornerstones of the field. 
In its basic form, it asserts that for a family of continuous linear operators (and thus bounded operators) whose domain is a Banach space, pointwise boundedness is equivalent to uniform boundedness in operator norm.

The theorem was first published in 1927 by Stefan Banach and Hugo Steinhaus, but it was also proven independently by Hans Hahn.

Theorem

The completeness of  enables the following short proof, using the Baire category theorem.

There are also simple proofs not using the Baire theorem .

Corollaries

However, since  is bounded in operator norm, and the limit operator  is continuous, a standard "" estimate shows that  converges to  uniformly on  sets. 

Indeed, the elements of  define a pointwise bounded family of continuous linear forms on the Banach space  which is the continuous dual space of  

If the collection  is unbounded in  then the uniform boundedness principle implies:

Therefore  is the complement of a subset of first category in a  Baire space. By definition of a Baire space, such sets (called  or ) are dense. 

Example: pointwise convergence of Fourier series

For  its Fourier series is defined by

and the N-th symmetric partial sum is

where  is the -th Dirichlet kernel. Fix  and consider the convergence of  
The functional  defined by

is bounded. 

It can be verified that

So the collection  is unbounded in  the dual of  

More can be concluded by applying the principle of condensation of singularities. 
Let  be a dense sequence in  
Define  in the similar way as above.

Generalizations

In a topological vector space (TVS)  "bounded subset" refers specifically to the notion of a von Neumann bounded subset.

Barrelled spaces

Attempts to find classes of locally convex topological vector spaces on which the uniform boundedness principle holds eventually led to barrelled spaces. 
That is, the least restrictive setting for the uniform boundedness principle is a barrelled space, where the following generalized version of the theorem holds :

Uniform boundedness in topological vector spaces

A family  of subsets of a topological vector space  is said to be  in  if there exists some bounded subset  of  such that 

which happens if and only if 
 
if  is a normed space then this happens if and only if there exists some real  such that  

Generalizations involving nonmeager subsets

Although the notion of a nonmeager set is used in the following version of the uniform bounded principle, the domain  is  assumed to be a Baire space.

Sequences of continuous linear maps

The following theorem establishes conditions for the pointwise limit of a sequence of continuous linear maps to be itself continuous. 

If in addition the domain is a Banach space and the codomain is a normed space then

Complete metrizable domain

 proves a weaker form of this theorem with Fréchet spaces rather than the usual Banach spaces.

See also

Notes

Citations

Bibliography

 . 
  
  
 .
  
  
  
 .
  
  
  
 .
 .
  
  

Articles containing proofs
Functional analysis
Mathematical principles
Theorems in functional analysis